The 1924–25 Bradford City A.F.C. season was the 18th in the club's history.

The club finished 16th in Division Two, and reached the 3rd round of the FA Cup.

Sources

References

Bradford City A.F.C. seasons
Bradford City